Ahavas Israel Cemetery is located at 1801 Garfield Avenue in Grand Rapids, Michigan. It is the cemetery for the Conservative Ahavas Israel congregation.

The Ahavas Achim Cemetery was created in 1916 by members of the Ahavas Achim and the Workmen's Circle. The Ahavas Achim was a conservative community founded by Orthodox members that had split from Grand Rapid's Temple Beth Israel in 1908. The Workmen's Circle was a service organisation for Jewish men. Temple Beth Israel and Ahavas Achim eventually merged in 1947, having begun discussions on a merger in 1937 prompted by the financial pressures of maintaining two Orthodox congregations in the midst of the Great Depression in the United States. The cemetery was renamed the Ahavas Israel Cemetery in 1962.

References

External links 
 Ahavas Israel (Grand Rapids, MI) – cemetery contact
 International Jewish Cemetery Project at International Association of Jewish Genealogical Societies (IAJGS)
 JewishGen Online Worldwide Burial Registry (JOWBR) at JewishGen

Jewish cemeteries in the United States
1916 establishments in Michigan
Cemeteries in Michigan